Elly Griffiths is the pen name of Domenica de Rosa (born 17 August 1963, in London), a British crime novelist. She has written three series as Griffiths, one featuring  Ruth Galloway, one featuring Detective Inspector Edgar Stephens and Max Mephisto, and the Harbinder Kaur series.

Early life
After reading English at King's College London, Griffiths worked in publishing for many years.

Writing career
Griffiths' first series features as a main character forensic archaeologist Ruth Galloway, who lives in a remote seaside cottage near King's Lynn in Norfolk and teaches at the University of North Norfolk. This character was inspired by Griffiths' husband, who gave up a city job to train as an archaeologist, and her aunt, "who lives on the Norfolk coast and filled her niece's head with the myths and legends of that area". Griffiths released the first book in this series, The Crossing Places (Ruth Galloway, #1), in 2009.

Griffiths' second series, set in 1950s Brighton, focuses on the duo of Detective Inspector Edgar Stephens and magician Max Mephisto. Griffiths released the first book in this series, The Zig Zag Girl, in 2014.

In 2017 Griffiths was the Programming Chair for the Theakstons Old Peculier Crime Writing Festival, part of the Harrogate International Festivals portfolio.

Griffiths won the 2020 Edgar Allan Poe Award for best novel for The Stranger Diaries. In 2021, The Postscript Murders was shortlisted in the Gold Dagger category at the Crime Writer's Association Awards, with the result to be announced in July 2021.

Personal life
Griffiths lives near Brighton. She is married, and has two children and a cat.

Bibliography

As Elly Griffiths

Ruth Galloway series

Stephens and Mephisto Mystery series

 The Zig Zag Girl (2014)
 Smoke and Mirrors (2015)
 The Blood Card (2016)
 The Vanishing Box (2017)
 Now You See Them (2019)
 The Midnight Hour (2021)
 The Great Deceiver (2023)

Harbinder Kaur series
 The Stranger Diaries (2018)
 The Postscript Murders (2020)
 Bleeding Heart Yard (2022)

For Children
A Girl Called Justice (2019)
The Smugglers' Secret (2020)
A Ghost in the Garden (2021)

As Domenica de Rosa
The Eternal City (2005)
One Summer in Tuscany (2008)
The Italian Quarter (2004)
The Secret of Villa Serena (2007)
Return to the Italian Quarter (2018)

References

External links
 
 

1963 births
Living people
Alumni of King's College London
21st-century British novelists
British women novelists
21st-century British women writers
Women crime writers
Writers from London
21st-century pseudonymous writers
Pseudonymous women writers
British crime fiction writers